Ghum railway station of the Darjeeling Himalayan Railway is the highest railway station in India. The place is the home of the Ghum Monastery and the Batasia Loop, a bend of the Darjeeling Himalayan Railway.

Construction of the Darjeeling Himalayan Railway started in 1879 and the railway track reached Ghum on 4 April 1881. Until 1878, the journey from Kolkata to Darjeeling took 5–6 days — using steam-engine-pulled trains, crossing the Ganges by steam ferry at Sahebganj, and then using bullock carts and palanquins. In 1878, Siliguri was put on the railway map of India, cutting down the journey to two days. In 2007, the train journey from Kolkata to New Jalpaiguri (a new railway station  from Siliguri) takes about 10 hours. Thereafter it is 3–4 hours to Ghum or Darjeeling by road or 6–7 hours by the Darjeeling Himalayan Railway. Those who are not eager to travel all the way from New Jalpaiguri to Darjeeling by the slow train climbing up the hill can enjoy a ride on the tourist train from Darjeeling to Ghum and back.

 

Ghum is (falsely) claimed by some tourist literature to be the highest railway station in the world. It never was. In Switzerland, the Jungfraubahn (JB) is a  rack railway which runs  from Kleine Scheidegg to the highest railway station in Europe at Jungfraujoch (elevation  ).

References

Railway stations in Darjeeling district
Northeast Frontier Railway zone